The Carleton F. Burke Handicap is an American Thoroughbred horse race run annually at Santa Anita Park in Arcadia, California. Raced in late October as part of the Oak Tree Racing Association series, it is open to horses age three and older and is contested on turf at a distance of one-and-one-half miles (twelve furlongs). The race is named in honor of Carleton F. Burke, the first chairman of the California Horse Racing Board (CHRB) who later served as the Director of Racing at Santa Anita Park.

From inception in 1969 through 1994, the Carleton F. Burke Handicap was raced at 1 miles. It was run in two divisions in 1975 and 1978.

A Grade I event as recently as 1989, the Carleton F. Burke Handicap held a Grade III classification until 2011. The race was not run in 2008 and 2009 in order to accommodate the Breeders' Cup races. When the Santa Anita fall meet was moved to Hollywood Park in 2010, the race was not run again. As a result, the American Graded Stakes Committee announced that the race was not eligible for grading in 2011. If a race is not run for two consecutive years, it is not eligible for grading.

On October 9, 1977, Double Discount won this race in a world record time of 1:57 for 1 miles on turf.

Records
Speed  record:
 2:24.13 - Spring House (2007) (at current distance of  miles)
 1:57.40 - Double Discount (1977) (World Record at previous distance of  miles)

Most wins:
 2 - Fiddle Isle (1969, 1970)

Most wins by an owner:
 3 - Howard B. Keck (1969, 1970, 1974)

Most wins by a jockey:
 7 - Bill Shoemaker (1969, 1970, 1975, 1976, 1978, 1980, 1986)

Most wins by a trainer:
 11 - Charles Whittingham (1969, 1970, 1972, 1974, 1975, 1976, 1978, 1980, 1986, 1987, 1988)

Winners

 † In 1973, Groshawk finished first but was disqualified and set back to fifth. In 1990, Rial finished first but was disqualified and set back second.

Notes

References
 The 2007 Carleton F. Burke Handicap

Discontinued horse races
Open middle distance horse races
Horse races in California
Turf races in the United States
Recurring sporting events established in 1969
Recurring sporting events disestablished in 2007
Santa Anita Park
1969 establishments in California
2007 disestablishments in California